For the Oldest House Museum in Key West, Florida see Old Island Restoration Foundation

The Oldest House Museum is located in St. Augustine, Florida in St. Johns County, Florida. It is operated by the St. Augustine Historical Society and includes the González-Alvarez House, the Manucy Museum (named for Albert Manucy) of local history and the Edwards Gallery.

The Oldest House, from which the museum derives its name, is located on a site that has been occupied since the 1600s. Formally known as the González-Alvarez House, it is the oldest surviving Spanish Colonial dwelling in Florida. The building dates back to the early 1700s. The house has been open to visitors since 1893. The United States Department of the Interior designated the house a National Historic Landmark in 1970.

References

External links
Oldest House St. Augustine Historical Society

Historic house museums in Florida
Spanish Florida
History museums in Florida
Museums in St. Augustine, Florida
1893 establishments in Florida